The School of Edessa was a Christian theological school of great importance to the Syriac-speaking world. It had been founded as long ago as the 2nd century by the kings of the Abgar dynasty. In 363, Nisibis fell to the Persians, causing St. Ephrem the Syrian, accompanied by a number of teachers, to leave the School of Nisibis. They went to Edessa, where Ephrem took over the directorship of its school. Then, its importance grew still further. There were innumerable monasteries at Edessa housing many monks. Ephrem occupied a cell there, practicing the ascetic life, interpreting Holy Scripture, composing poetry and hymns and teaching in the school, as well as instructing young girls in church music.

The first recorded director of the School of Edessa was Qiiore, in the early 5th century. He had ascetic and scholarly qualifications and an administrative ability. Occupying the Chair of Exegesis (mepasqana), he replaced the texts of Ephraim with those of Theodore of Mopsuestia. With that seminal decision, Qiiore embarked upon a course of study that was to mix the deductive principles of Aristotle with Theodore's Dyophysite creed.

In 489, after the Nestorian Schism, the Byzantine emperor Zeno, acting on the advice of Bishop Cyrus II of Edessa, ordered the school summarily closed for its teachings of Nestorian doctrine. Its scholars moved back to the School of Nisibis.

People
The following people are associated with the School of Edessa:

Barhadbshabba Arbaya, historian of the school (c.600)
Barsauma, student and teacher (fl. 489)
Elishaʿ bar Quzbaye, student (early 5th century)
Ephrem the Syrian, teacher (360s)
Ibas of Edessa, head (early 5th century)
Jacob of Serugh, student (late 5th century)
Narsai, student and head (fl. 471)

References

Bibliography

 
 
 
 
 
 
 
 

Edessa
Church of the East
Nestorianism
Osroene
Eastern Christianity in Turkey
Eastern Christianity in Syria
Religious academies in Babylon
Christian schools
Christian terminology
Edessa